Pavel Romanovich Popovich (romanized: Pavlo Romanovych Popovych) (5 October 1930 – 29 September 2009) was a Soviet cosmonaut.

Popovich was the fourth cosmonaut in space, the sixth person in orbit, the eighth person and first Ukrainian in space.

Biography 

Popovich was born in Uzyn, Kyiv Oblast, Ukrainian SSR to Roman Porfirievich Popovich (a firefighter in a sugar factory) and Theodosia Kasyanovna Semyonova. He had two sisters (one older, one younger) and two brothers (both younger).

During World War II, the Germans occupied Uzyn and burned documents, including Popovich's birth certificate. After the war, these were restored through witness testimony, and although his mother said that Popovich was born in 1929, two witnesses insisted it was in 1930, which thus became the official year of his birth.

In 1947, Popovich left vocational school in Bila Tserkva with qualifications as a carpenter. In 1951, Popovich graduated as a construction engineer from a technical school in Magnitogorsk, as well as receiving a pilot's degree.

In 1954, Popovich joined the Young Communist League.

He married Marina Popovich, a retired Soviet Air Force colonel and test pilot. They had two daughters but later divorced, and Popovich married Alevtina Oshegova.

Popovich was a keen weightlifter:
"Service in the Air Force made us strong, both physically and morally. All of us cosmonauts took up sports and PT seriously when we served in the Air Force. I know that Yuri Gagarin was fond of ice hockey. He liked to play goal keeper. Gherman Titov was a gymnastics enthusiast, Andriyan Nikolayev liked skiing, Pavel Popovich went in for weight lifting. I don't think I am wrong when I say that sports became a fixture in the life of the cosmonauts."

He was also a member of the Supreme Soviet of the Ukrainian Soviet Socialist Republic 6th–11th convocations.

After his retirement in 1993, Popovich lived in Moscow.

Popovich died in a hospital in Gurzuf where he was taken following a stroke on 29 September 2009. Brain hemorrhage was cited as the cause of death. He was buried in Moscow.

Military 
In 1952, Popovich graduated from a course at the Stalingrad Military Aviation School near Novosibirsk. He then went on to train at the Military Officers of the Air Force Aviation Training School in Grozny, until 1954, when he joined the Soviet Air Force.

Service 
Details are from Space Encyclopedia ASTROnote, unless otherwise noted

Aircraft types flown:
 Yakovlev Yak-11
 Yakovlev Yak-18
 Lavochkin La-9
 Mikoyan-Gurevich MiG-15

Training 
Details are from Space Encyclopedia ASTROnote, unless otherwise noted

Promotions 
Details are from Space Encyclopedia ASTROnote, unless otherwise noted

Cosmonaut 

In 1960, he was selected as one of the first group of twenty air force pilots that would train as the first cosmonauts for the Soviet space program. The training took place between March 1960 and January 1961, and Popovich passed his final exams in Cosmonaut Basic Training on 17/18 January 1961. He was appointed as an astronaut on 25 January 1961.

He was considered as a strong candidate for the first spaceflight – but while Yuri Gagarin was ultimately chosen for the Vostok 1 flight, Popovich served as the flight's capcom.

From May to August 1961, he trained to fly on spacecraft "Vostok-2" in a group of astronauts, followed (between September and November 1961) with training to fly "Vostok-3". This flight was cancelled. Between November 1961 and May 1962, he trained as a pilot for "Vostok-4". Between June and August of that year, he received further training in the maintenance of this spacecraft.

He commanded the space flight Vostok 4 in 1962 which, along with Andrian Nikolayev on Vostok 3, was the first time that more than one manned spacecraft were in orbit at the same time. His call sign for this flight was Golden eagle.

In January 1964, he became a cosmonaut instructor, becoming deputy commander to the 2nd group of cosmonauts.

Popovich was selected to command one of the Soviet Union's planned Moon landings, and trained for this between 1966 and 1968, when the Soviet Moon landing plans were scrapped.

In 1968, he was selected as commander for Soyuz 2, but after the death of Vladimir Komarov during the reentry of Soyuz 1, Soyuz 2 was launched without a crew.

In 1969 he was a senior cosmonaut instructor, and became (by 1972) the Chief of cosmonaut training.

In 1974, he commanded his second (and final) space flight Soyuz 14 in 1974. Again, his call sign for this flight was Golden eagle. This flight was the first to the Salyut 3 space station.

In 1977, he received a post-graduate degree in technical sciences.

In March 1978, he was on duty in the Flight Control Center for Vladimír Remek's flight aboard Soyuz 28.

From 1978 he was the deputy chief of the Gagarin Cosmonauts Training Center responsible for research and testing work. From 1980 to 1989, he was Deputy chief of the Cosmonaut Training Center. In January 1982, he was removed from the list of active cosmonauts, so that he could serve as Deputy Chief for Scientific Testing and Research at the Center.

Sociopolitical life 
Details are from Space Encyclopedia ASTROnote, unless otherwise noted
 From 1992: Chairman of the Boxing Federation of Russia.
 From 1994: President of the Yuri Gagarin Foundation; President of the Social Support for Veterans of the Armed Forces of the Union
 From 1996: Member of the Editorial Board of Space News
 From 1998: Member of the Editorial Board of the All-Russia scientific and technical magazine Flight
 From 1999: President of the Ukrainian Union of Cosmonauts
 Member of the Writers' Union of Russia.
 President of the Association of Space Museums of Russia (AMKOS)
 Honorary President of the International Association of Veterans of Physical Education and Sport (MAFIS)
 Honorary Chairman of the Society of Ukrainian Culture (Slavutich)

Awards and honors 
Details are from Space Encyclopedia ASTROnote, unless otherwise noted

Notes:
 a For setting records in space flight
 b Medal number 11117
 c For services to the state, many years of fruitful work in the field of culture and art (as President of the Association of Space Museums) (Presidential Decree No. 512 of April 9, 1996) 
 d For services to the state and long-term fruitful work (Presidential Decree No. 1724 on October 6, 2000)
 e For significant personal contribution to the development and strengthening of Ukrainian-Russian relations, promoting the rise of the authority of the Ukrainian state in the world (Presidential Decree No. 1682/2005 dated December 1, 2005)

Other honours 

He received honorary citizenship of several cities:
 In Russia: Kalugaa, Kovrov, Magnitogorsk (1965), Yuzhno-Sakhalinsk
 In Ukraine: Poltava, Zaporizhzhia and Bila Tserkva
 In Bulgaria: Targovishte
 In Kazakhstan: Guriev

Notes:
 a Popovich is the only person to have received the honorary citizenship of Kaluga twice. The first time was in August 1962 (Decision 597 of the Executive Committee of Kaluga City Council of Workers' Deputies), and the second time was in April 1964 (Decision 237 of the Executive Committee of Kaluga City Council of Workers' Deputies).

A bronze sculpture to Popovich was established in Uzyn.

The name of Pavel Popovich was given to a mountain ridge in Antarctica and to the Mars-crossing asteroid 8444 Popovich.

In 1991, he became director of the Institute Rossiyskogo for Monitoring of Land and Ecosystems, then worked as chairman of the board of directors of the All-Russia Institute of Aero-Photo-Geodesic Studies (VISKhAGI), dealing with the compilation of a land inventory of Russia using images from space.

He had also been the chairman of Ukrainian diaspora organisation in Russia.

He was awarded a Gold Tsiolkovsky Medal by the Academy of Sciences of the USSR and a De La Vaux Medal from the Fédération Aéronautique Internationale.

In Ukraine there was a celebration of the 80th anniversary of the birth of the first Ukrainian astronaut, twice the Hero of the Soviet Union P.P. Popovich.

Ufology
In 1984 Popovich joined the Russian Academy of Sciences' newly created All-Union Investigation Committee for Anomalous Aerial Phenomena and became head of the Academy's UFO Commission.

In the 2002 SciFi Channel documentary Out of the Blue, Popovich relays a sighting of a UFO next to the airplane he was travelling aboard as he was returning home from Washington D.C. with a delegation of scientists. The UFO was seen by everyone on board the plane. The object had an estimated speed of  travelling parallel to the airplane and passed and overtook the plane in about 30 to 40 seconds.

Popovich was the president of the UFO association of Russia.

Bibliography
Details are from Space Encyclopedia ASTROnote, unless otherwise noted

Books 
 "I Flew in the Morning" (1974)
 "Space Humanity" (1981)
 "Tested in Space and on Earth" (1982)
 "Endless Road Universe" (1985)
 "Robinson of the Universe" (1986)

Works in Collections 
 "Space – My Job"
 "High Orbit"
 "Star"
 "Conquest of Infinity"
 "... 3, 2, 1!"

Essays 
 "Secrets of the Galaxy"
 "Mysteries of the Eternal Cosmos"
 "Forward – to the Sources of the Past"

References

Further reading
 
  Codr, Milan. "O kosmických dnech a nocích" (Praha : Práce, 1987)
 Codru, Milan. "The cosmic days and nights" (Prague: Práce, 1987)
  Codr, Milan. "Sto hvězdných kapitánů" (Praha: Práce, 1982)
 Codr, Milan. "Sto Star Captains" (Prague: Práce, 1982)
 
  Ребров, М. Ф. "Советские космонавты" (2-е изд.) (М.: Воениздат, 1983)
 Rebrov, M. F. "Soviet cosmonauts" (2nd ed.) (Moscow: Military Publishing, 1983)
  Шкадов, И. Н. (Пред.ред.коллегии) "Герои Советского Союза: Краткий биографический словарь. Т.2." (М.: Воениздат, 1988)
 Shkadov, J. H. (editor) "Heroes of the Soviet Union: A brief biographical dictionary Vol. 2" (Moscow: Voenizdat, 1988)
 "Testing of rocket and space technology - the business of my life" Events and facts - A.I. Ostashev, Korolyov, 2001.;
 "Bank of the Universe" - edited by Boltenko A. C., Kyiv, 2014., publishing house "Phoenix", 
 "Rockets and people" – B. E. Chertok, M: "mechanical engineering", 1999.  
 A.I. Ostashev, Sergey Pavlovich Korolyov - The Genius of the 20th Century — 2010 M. of Public Educational Institution of Higher Professional Training MGUL .
 "S. P. Korolev. Encyclopedia of life and creativity" - edited by C. A. Lopota, RSC Energia. S. P. Korolev, 2014 
 Hall, Rex; David Shayler; Bert Vis. Russia's Cosmonauts: Inside the Yuri Gagarin. Praxis. 2005

External links

  Peoples History – from "Советские космонавты" (Soviet Cosmonauts)
  Медицинская Газета (Medical Newspaper) Interview with Popovich
  Biograph.ru Biography
  Novye Izvestiya Obituary – includes extracts from Popovich's logbook
The official website of the city administration Baikonur - Honorary citizens of Baikonur
http://www.istpravda.com.ua/articles/2012/08/15/91709/
http://www.tvroscosmos.ru/4193/
https://twitter.com/search?q=Pavel%20Popovich&src=typd
http://www.bbc.com/ukrainian/blog-history-40900761

1930 births
2009 deaths
Burials in Troyekurovskoye Cemetery
People from Uzyn
1962 in spaceflight
Heroes of the Soviet Union
Soviet cosmonauts
Recipients of the Order of Lenin
Recipients of the Order of Friendship of Peoples
Recipients of the Order of Honour (Russia)
Recipients of the Order of Prince Yaroslav the Wise, 4th class
Sixth convocation members of the Verkhovna Rada of the Ukrainian Soviet Socialist Republic
Seventh convocation members of the Verkhovna Rada of the Ukrainian Soviet Socialist Republic
Eighth convocation members of the Verkhovna Rada of the Ukrainian Soviet Socialist Republic
Ninth convocation members of the Verkhovna Rada of the Ukrainian Soviet Socialist Republic
Tenth convocation members of the Verkhovna Rada of the Ukrainian Soviet Socialist Republic
Eleventh convocation members of the Verkhovna Rada of the Ukrainian Soviet Socialist Republic
Soviet Air Force generals
Soviet major generals
Ukrainian cosmonauts
Vostok program cosmonauts
Astronaut-politicians
Salyut program cosmonauts